The 9th Politburo of the Communist Party of Vietnam (CPV), formally the 9th Political Bureau of the Central Committee of the Communist Party of Vietnam (Vietnamese: Bộ Chính trị Ban Chấp hành trung ương Đảng Cộng sản Việt Nam Khoá IX), was elected at the 1st Plenary Session of the 9th Central Committee in the immediate aftermath of the 9th National Congress.

Members

References

Bibliography
 Chân dung 19 ủy viên Bộ Chính trị khóa XII

9th Politburo of the Communist Party of Vietnam
2001 in Vietnam
2006 in Vietnam